The Puerto Rican spindalis (Spindalis portoricensis) is a bird endemic to the island of Puerto Rico, where it is commonly known as reina mora. The species is widely distributed throughout the island and is an important part of the Puerto Rican ecosystem because of its help in seed dispersal and plant reproduction. The Puerto Rican spindalis is the unofficial national bird of Puerto Rico.

Taxonomy

The Puerto Rican spindalis was originally classified as Spindalis zena portoricensis, making it a subspecies of the western spindalis (Spindalis zena). In 1997, an article was published which presented an extensive analysis of the genus Spindalis. The report concluded, based on differences in weight, color, pattern, distribution, and voice, that a split of S. zena was necessary. Four distinct species were identified—Spindalis dominicensis,  Spindalis nigricephala, Spindalis portoricensis and Spindalis zena. S. zena was also subdivided into five subspecies: S. z. pretrei, S. z. salvini, S. z. benedicti, S. z. townsendi and S. z. zena. Specifically, the difference in vocalization, and morphology, distinguish S. portoricensis from S. dominicensis.

Description

The Puerto Rican spindalis exhibits sexual dimorphism with males being brightly colored and females being dully colored. Males are green colored above with an orange neck and chest. They have a black head with two white stripes running across it, with one above and one below the eyes. The tail and wings are gray to black with small white stripes at the tips. In contrast, the female is a dull olive-green color with slightly noticeable white stripes. Sexual dimorphism is also noticeable in weight and size. Females are slightly heavier but smaller in length than males. The male's weight ranges from 22.5 to 37.0 grams with an average of 30.8 grams while the female's ranges from 28.0 to 41.1 grams with an average of 33.5 grams. The length of the male's wings ranges from 82 to 88.5 mm with an average of 85.2 mm while the female's range from 80 to 85.5 mm with an average of 82.6 mm. The length of the male's tail ranges from 59 to 68 mm with an average of 63.3 mm while the female's range from 56 to 65.5 mm with an average of 60.6 mm.

Distribution and habitat

The Puerto Rican spindalis is currently found more commonly in plantations than in their natural habitat, the forests of Maricao and the El Yunque National Forest. It may also be found in gardens, scavenging for flower nectar, and other areas where fruits are grown. It can be attracted by a sugar solution. It is distributed throughout the entire main island of Puerto Rico and is rarely found above 1000 meters in elevation.

Ecology and behavior

The Puerto Rican spindalis are usually found in pairs but may travel in small flocks. These birds also engage in a behavior called mobbing. This is when a flock of birds, from one or more species, attack a known predator, usually to defend their eggs or hatchlings.  Such behavior has been observed being directed against the Puerto Rican boa by immature Puerto Rican spindalis.

The vocalization of the Puerto Rican spindalis is not as complex as that of other Spindalis species; only the songs of S. dominicensis are less elaborate. As with all Spindalis, the males emit high pitched sounds at 8 kHz or higher, usually from treetops high above the ground. Females, on the other hand, sing "whisper songs" usually from dense areas close to the ground. The most common vocalization is described as a "continuing series of high-pitched, thin, sibilant notes, given in a rhythmic pattern." Other vocalizations include a fast tweet and a short chi chi chi.

Diet
The Puerto Rican spindalis commonly eats fruit from Schefflera morototoni, Cecropia schreberiana, Cordia sulcata, Ficus species, Phoradendron species and Inga vera trees, with fruit from S. morototoni being the most important. Because of the difficulty of digestion and the small amount of energy that fruit and leaves provide, these birds also include insects and small lizards as part of their diet.

Reproduction
The Puerto Rican spindalis builds cup-shaped nests from various plant matter. Two to four eggs are laid at a time. Eggs are usually light blue in color with brown patches around the large end, but regional variations are known to exist. They measure, on average, 23.7 by 17.3 mm.

See also 

 Fauna of Puerto Rico
 List of birds of Puerto Rico
 List of endemic fauna of Puerto Rico
 List of Puerto Rican birds
 List of Vieques birds
 El Toro Wilderness

Notes

References

Further reading

Puerto Rican spindalis
Endemic birds of Puerto Rico
Puerto Rican spindalis
Puerto Rican spindalis